Metasphenisca parilis is a species of tephritid or fruit flies in the genus Metasphenisca of the family Tephritidae.

Distribution
Malawi, Zimbabwe.

References

Tephritinae
Insects described in 1947
Diptera of Africa